"The Band Played On", also known (by its refrain) as "Casey Would Waltz with a Strawberry Blonde", is a popular song. It was written in 1895 with lyrics by John F. Palmer and music by Charles B. Ward (1865–1917).

The chorus is much better known than the verses to later generations.

The lyrics of the refrain:

 Casey would waltz with a strawberry blonde
 And the band played on.
 He'd glide 'cross the floor with the girl he adored
 And the band played on. But his brain was so loaded it nearly exploded; The poor girl would shake with alarm. He'd ne'er leave the girl with the strawberry curls And the band played on. The song has become a pop standard with many recordings made. One of the first was made by Dan W. Quinn for Berliner Gramophone in 1895, which is the same year the song was first published.

The song was later featured in many films, including Raoul Walsh's The Strawberry Blonde (1941), the title of which was inspired by the lyrics, and Alfred Hitchcock's Strangers on a Train (1951).

Cover versions

One of the most famous recordings, by Guy Lombardo's orchestra (vocal by Kenny Gardner and the Leonardo Trio), was made on February 26, 1941 and issued by Decca Records as catalog number 3675 (reissued as number 25341), coinciding with the release of the film The Strawberry Blonde, in which the song appeared. It first reached the Billboard magazine Best Seller chart on May 9, 1941 and lasted 4 weeks on the chart, peaking at #6.
 The Guy Lombardo version included only the famous chorus, omitting the 2/4-time verses. 

The numerous other recordings of the number include: 
Frank D'Rone - a single release as "The Strawberry Blonde" (this reached the UK charts in 1960, peaking at No. 24); Connie Francis - for her album Sing Along with Connie Francis  (1961); Alvin and the Chipmunks in the 1962 album The Chipmunk Songbook; Bing Crosby who included the song in a medley on his album On the Sentimental Side (1962); Alice Faye - for the album Alice Faye Sings Her Greatest Movie Hits (1962); and Mandy Patinkin - for his album Mandy Patinkin'' (1989).

References

External links
Lyrics of the song on https://www.musixmatch.com/lyrics/Guy-Lombardo/The-Band-Played-On, on Musixmatch

1895 songs
Guy Lombardo songs
Songs about music
Songs about musicians

In Alfred Hitchcock's psychological thriller Strangers on a Train, the song is the carousel music at the amusement park.